Jean Lafleur is a Canadian businessman famous for his role in the Liberal Party of Canada sponsorship scandal.

Role in Sponsorship scandal
On April 27, 2007, Lafleur returned to Canada from a two-year stay in Belize, where he was reported to have lived in an exclusive villa and enjoyed fine wines. Lafleur pleaded guilty to 28 fraud charges for his role in the scandal.  He gave 76 false invoices to Charles Guite, the civil servant responsible for the sponsorship program in Public Works Department of the federal government in the 1990s.

Counting time served, Lafleur was given a sentence of 42 months in prison, and ordered to pay back CDN $1.6 million to the federal government. His sentence was the highest handed out in the scandal, as he showed no remorse or co-operation in the investigation and trial. The crown prosecutor had sought a sentence of five years.

References

Canadian fraudsters
Businesspeople from Quebec
French Quebecers
Living people
People convicted of fraud
Corruption in Canada
Year of birth missing (living people)